is a Japanese volleyball player. She played in the 2016 Summer Olympics.

Life
She is part of the Japan women's national volleyball team. She participated at the 2015 FIVB Volleyball World Grand Prix, and the  2017 FIVB Volleyball World Grand Prix.

On club level she played for Denso Airybees in 2015.

Awards

Individual
 2019 Montreux Volley Masters "Best Outside Spiker"

References

1993 births
Living people
Japanese women's volleyball players
Denso Airybees players
Place of birth missing (living people)
Japan women's international volleyball players
Olympic volleyball players of Japan
Volleyball players at the 2016 Summer Olympics
Volleyball players at the 2018 Asian Games
Asian Games competitors for Japan